The Orkney child abuse scandal began on 27 February 1991 when social workers and police removed children  - five boys and four girls, aged eight to 15 and all from the families of English "incomers" - from their homes on the island of South Ronaldsay, in Orkney, Scotland, because of allegations of  child abuse. The children denied that any abuse had occurred, and medical examinations did not reveal any evidence of abuse.

Background
Shortly after a family's arrival in South Ronaldsay, the father was imprisoned in 1987 for child abuse. In June 1989, some of his children were taken into care, though they returned home the next month. Eight children in the family were taken into care in late 1990, and the two youngest were told that their mother was dead (it took six years before the last of these children was returned to their mother). One daughter was sexually abused by a care home worker, but after a friend told social workers about this, they assumed it had been done by an older sibling. During questioning described by a judge as "coaching", some of the children accused other parents, and a local church minister, of ritualistic satanic abuse.

After consultations among police, social workers, and local officers of the Royal Scottish Society for Prevention of Cruelty to Children, and after receiving legal authority from Scotland's most senior sheriff, on 27 February 1991 morning raids were made on the houses of the minister and the accused families. One of the children had already said their original accusations were lies. Nine children were taken away from four families.

Following a community meeting, many of the parents organised a support group, the South Ronaldsay Parents Action Committee, led by a local doctor, and assisted by the voluntary organisation Parents Against Injustice (PAIN). The group collected petitions of support that showed overwhelming scepticism about the charges.

Court case

The case came to court in April, and after a single day the presiding judge, Sheriff David Kelbie, dismissed the case as fatally flawed and the children of the four families were allowed to return home. The judge criticised the social workers involved, saying that their handling of the case had been "fundamentally flawed" and he found in summary that "these proceedings are so fatally flawed as to be incompetent" and that the children concerned had been separated and subjected to repeated cross-examinations almost as if the aim was to force confessions rather than to assist in therapy. Where two children made similar statements about abuse this appeared to be the result of "repeated coaching". He added that in his view "There is no lawful authority for that whatsoever". Sheriff Kelbie also said that he was unclear what the supposed evidence provided by the social services proved.

The children were returned by plane to Kirkwall airport on 4 April 1991 where they were reunited with their parents.

The Reporter appealed against the dismissal of the case and on 12 June 1991, the Court of Session, sitting as Scotland's premier civil appeal court, upheld the appeal, stating that the Sheriff had "allowed himself to form views about the contents [of the social workers' evidence that] would have made it impossible for him to bring a fair and balanced judgement to the issues".

The case was remitted back to the sheriff court to proceed.  The Reporter took the view that in the light of factors including the publicity since Kelbie's decision, the case was severely compromised.  The application was formally abandoned.

The objects seized during the raids were later returned; they included a videotape of the TV show Blackadder, a detective novel by Ngaio Marsh, and a model aeroplane made by one of the children from two pieces of wood, which was identified by social workers as a "wooden cross". The minister was asked to sign for the return of "three masks, two hoods, one black cloak", but refused to sign until the inventory was altered to "three nativity masks, two academic hoods, one priest's robe".

Inquiry

The controversy resulted in an official inquiry established in August 1991, chaired by Lord Clyde. The inquiry published its report in October 1992. It described the successful appeal against the first judgement as "most unfortunate" and criticised all those involved, including the social workers, the police, and the Orkney Islands Council. Social workers' training, methods, and judgement were given special condemnation, and the report stated that the concept of "ritual abuse" was "not only unwarrantable at present but may affect the objectivity of practitioners and parents".

Causes
Liz McLean, the social worker who led the interviews with the children, had also been involved in the 1990 Rochdale "Satanic Abuse" case. She was later sharply criticised by Lord Clyde in the official inquiry into the South Ronaldsay case, and in another investigation into similar allegations in Ayrshire.

Interviewing techniques
During the investigation the children received several lengthy interviews. McLean was later described by several of the children as a terrifying figure who was "fixated on finding satanic abuse", and other children described how she urged them to draw circles and faces, presumably as evidence indicating abusive rites. These techniques were strongly criticised by Sheriff Kelbie.

One of the children later said of the interviews:

"In order to get out of a room, after an hour or so of saying, 'No, this never happened', you'd break down."

One of the children later said:

Media

In 1992, an episode of the TV show Rumpole of the Bailey dealt with the Satanic Abuse hysteria. Called 'Rumpole and the Children of the Devil', it dealt with a panic over children, including leading questioning of them, wild accusations and taking of the children into care. It was inspired by the Orkney case, and earlier cases.

On 22 August 2006 a documentary on the case titled Accused produced by Blast! Films was transmitted by BBC2. The programme included dramatic reconstructions of some of the interviews conducted with the children by social workers, and allowed participants in the affair - including the children - to speak for themselves.

Victim lawsuit

In September 2006 it was announced that one person, who had been 8 years old when she was taken into care by social workers in November 1990, intended to sue the council.  She said that she had been the victim of a "witch hunt" by overzealous social workers determined to break up her family. She said that the interview techniques used at the time were designed to break the children down, and that she was bribed with sweets to tell social workers what they wanted to hear.

In February 2008 it was reported that she would receive legal aid to sue the Council.

See also
 Day-care sex-abuse hysteria
 Peter Ellis (childcare worker)
 St Helena child abuse scandal

Notes

References

Child abuse in Scotland
Scandals in Scotland
1991 in Scotland
False allegations of sex crimes
History of Orkney
High Court of Justiciary cases
Mass psychogenic illness
1991 in British law
Children's rights in Scotland
Social care in Scotland
20th century in Orkney
Child sexual abuse in Scotland